Canthon humectus is a species in the beetle family Scarabaeidae. It is found in Oceania.

Subspecies
These eight subspecies belong to the species Canthon humectus:
 Canthon humectus alvarengai Halffter, 1961
 Canthon humectus assimilis Robinson, 1946
 Canthon humectus blumei Halffter & Halffter, 2003
 Canthon humectus hidalgoensis Bates, 1887
 Canthon humectus humectus (Say, 1832)
 Canthon humectus incisus Robinson, 1948
 Canthon humectus riverai Halffter & Halffter, 2003
 Canthon humectus sayi Robinson, 1948

References

Further reading

 

Deltochilini
Articles created by Qbugbot
Beetles described in 1832